The canton of Foix is an administrative division of the Ariège department, southern France. It was created at the French canton reorganisation which came into effect in March 2015. Its seat is in Foix.

It consists of the following communes:
Cos
Ferrières-sur-Ariège
Foix
Ganac
Montgailhard
Saint-Pierre-de-Rivière

References

Cantons of Ariège (department)